Zog (rendered on the cover and title page as ZOG) is a 2010 children's picture book by Julia Donaldson and illustrated by Axel Scheffler, about a young accident-prone dragon, named Zog, who wants to be the best student in dragon school.

Reception
Booktrust reviewing Zog, wrote "The illustrations are as vivid, imaginative and amusing as you would expect from the illustrator of The Gruffalo, with subtle details that children and adults will love. The perfectly crafted rhyming text is ideal for reading aloud. And the ambitious princess is a great touch." 

Zog has also been reviewed by The Wall Street Journal, Booklist, and the School Library Journal. 

In 2010, the story book won the Galaxy National Book Award.

An interactive Zog-themed woodland nature trail for children was installed at Grizedale in Cumbria in 2019.

Publication history
Zog (2010), Alison Green
A Gold Star for Zog (2012), Arthur A. Levine Books

Television adaptation 
Magic Light Pictures produced a half-hour television adaptation, also known as Zog. Directed by Max Lang, it was broadcast on Christmas Day 2018 at 4:50 PM on BBC One. Magic Light previously adapted five other Donaldson/Scheffler books for the BBC, including The Gruffalo, The Gruffalo's Child, Room on the Broom, Stick Man and The Highway Rat. It won the 2018 International Emmy for Kids Animation.

Home media 
Zog was released on DVD on 11 February 2019 in the United Kingdom.

Voice cast 
 Sir Lenny Henry as the Narrator.
 Hugh Skinner as Zog, the orange accident-prone dragon who tries his best every day to win a golden star.
 Rocco Wright as Young Zog.
 Kit Harington as Sir Gadabout the Great, the knight in the story who, at one point, joins Zog for a fight.
 Patsy Ferran as Princess Pearl, the princess who lives in a castle with her uncle and dreams of being a doctor.
 Tracey Ullman as Madame Dragon, the green dragon and teacher at Dragon School who teaches the dragons throughout the school days.
 Rob Brydon as the Horse / Castle Guards.

Zog and the Flying Doctors 
The sequel, titled Zog and the Flying Doctors was published by Alison Green Books on 7 September 2016. On 12 November 2019, it was announced that Magic Light Pictures and BBC One would team up once again on Julia Donaldson and Axel Scheffler's Zog And The Flying Doctors for Christmas Day 2020 at 2:35pm, with music by French composer and musician Rene Aubry. Zog and the Flying Doctors was released on DVD on 22 March 2021 in the United Kingdom.

Voice cast 
 Sir Lenny Henry as the Narrator.
 Hugh Skinner as Zog the Dragon.
 Patsy Ferran as Princess Pearl.
 Rosabel Lawson as Young Princess Pearl.
 Daniel Ings as Sir Gadabout the Knight.
 Alexandra Roach as the Sunburnt Mermaid.
 Mark Bonnar as the Distressed Unicorn.
 Lucian Msamati as the Sneezy Lion.
 Rob Brydon as the King (Princess Pearl's Uncle).

References

2010 children's books
Books about dragons
British children's books
British picture books
Donaldson and Scheffler